Colydiinae is a subfamily of beetles, commonly known as cylindrical bark beetles. They have been treated historically as a family Colydiidae, but have been moved into the Zopheridae, where they constitute the bulk of the diversity of the newly expanded family, with about 140 genera worldwide. They are diverse for example in the Australian region, from where about 35 genera are known; in Europe, though, only 20 genera are found and many of these only with few species.

Little is known about the biology of these beetles. Most feed on fungi, others are carnivores and eat small arthropods such as bark beetles.

Systematics and taxonomy
Up to 9 tribes are accepted by various authors; others, however, synonymize some of these. Formerly, many additional tribes were recognized, but the Synchitini, for example, are today generally held to include a number of these tribes, and are even sometimes merged into the Colydiini.

The tribes are:
 Acropini
 Adimerini
 Colydiini Billberg, 1820
 Gempylodini
 Nematidiini
 Orthocerini Blanchard, 1845 (= Sarrotriini Billberg, 1820 (nom. rej.))
 Rhagoderini
 Rhopalocerini
 Synchitini Erichson, 1845 (sometimes in Colydiini)

Delimitation of the Colydiinae against the other lineages of Zopheridae is usually unproblematic. The only significant case of dispute may be the Pycnomerini, which is a small lineage of Zopheridae incertae sedis and was formerly considered an independent family like the "Colydiidae". That treatment is almost certainly wrong, but whether these beetles should be placed in Zopheridae as an additional subfamily Pycnomerinae, or treated as tribe Pycnomerini – and if the latter, whether they are better included in the Colydiinae or the Zopherinae – is still disputed.

Selected genera
Genera of cylindrical bark beetles include:

 Ablabus Broun, 1880
 Acolobicus
 Acolophoides Slipinski & Lawrence, 1997
 Acolophus Sharp, 1885
 Acostonotus Slipinski & Lawrence, 1997
 Acropis Burmeister, 1840
 Afrorthocerus
 Allobitoma Broun, 1921
 Alluauditoma
 Anosyana
 Antilissus Sharp, 1879
 Ascomma
 Asprotera
 Asynchita
 Atyscus
 Aulonium Erichson, 1845
 Bhutania
 Bitoma Herbst, 1793
 Bolcocius Dajoz, 1977
 Bulasconotus Ślipiński & Lawrence, 1997
 Bupala
 Cacotarphius
 Caprodes Pascoe, 1863
 Catolaemus
 Cebia Pascoe, 1863
 Cerchanotus Erichson, 1845
 Chorasus Sharp, 1882 (including Vitiacus)
 Cicablabus Slipinski & Lawrence, 1997
 Cicones
 Ciconissus Broun, 1893 (including Caanthus)
 Colobicones Grouvelle, 1918
 Colobicus Latreille, 1807
 Colydium Fabricius, 1792
 Colydodes
 Corticus Germar, 1824
 Coxelus Dejean, 1821
 Dechomus
 Denophloeus
 Diodesma Latreille, 1829
 Diplagia Reitter, 1882
 Diplotoma
 Ditomoidea
 Emilka
 Endeitoma Sharp, 1894
 Endocoxelus
 Endophloeus Dejean, 1834
 Enhypnon Carter, 1919
 Epistranodes Slipinski & Lawrence, 1997
 Epistranus Sharp, 1878
 Erylus
 Eucicones
 Eudesma
 Eulachus
 Faecula Slipinski & Lawrence, 1997
 Fenerivia
 Gempylodes Pascoe 1863
 Glenentela Broun, 1893
 Glyphocryptus Sharp, [1885]
 Helioctamenus Schaufuss, 1882
 Heterargus Sharp, 1886 (including Gathocles, Protarphius)
 Holopleuridia
 Hyberis
 Hybonotus Ślipiński & Lawrence, 1997
 Hystricones
 Isotarphius
 Kanantsia
 Labrotrichus
 Langelandia Aubé, 1843
 Lascobitoma Slipinski & Lawrence, 1997
 Lasconotus Erichson, 1845
 Lascotonus
 Lascotrichus
 Lastrema Reitter, 1882
 Linophloeus
 Lobogestoria
 Lobomesa Slipinski & Lawrence, 1997
 Lyreus Aubé, 1861
 Madacones
 Madadesia
 Madenphloeus
 Mamakius
 Megataphrus
 Microprius Fairmaire, 1868
 Microsicus
 Mnionychus
 Monoedus Horn, 1882 (including Adimerus)
 Munaria Reitter, 1882
 Namunaria Reitter, 1882 (including Sympanotus)
 Nematidium Erichson, 1845
 Neotrichus Sharp, 1885
 Niphopelta Reitter, 1882
 Norix Broun, 1893
 Nosodomodes Reitter, 1922
 Notocoxelus Ślipiński & Lawrence, 1997
 Orthocerus Latreille, 1796 (including Sarrotrium)
 Paha
 Paratarphius
 Paryphus
 Pharax
 Phloeodalis
 Phloeonemus
 Phormesa
 Phorminx Carter & Zeck, 1937
 Phreatus
 Priolomopsis
 Priolomus
 Pristoderus Hope, 1840 (including Dryptops, Enarsus, Recyntus, Sparactus)
 Prosteca Wollaston, 1860
 Pseudendestes Lawrence, 1980
 Pseudocorticus
 Pseudotarphius
 Rechodes
 Rhagodera Mannerheim 1843
 Rhopalocerus Redtenbacher, 1842
 Rytinotus Broun, 1880
 Sallachius
 Sassaka
 Sechellotoma
 Sprecodes
 Synagathis Carter & Zeck, 1937
 Syncalus Sharp, 1876 (including Acosmetus)
 Synchita Hellwig, 1792
 Tarphiablabus Ślipiński & Lawrence, 1997
 Tarphiomimus Wollaston, 1873
 Tarphiosoma
 Tarphius Erichson, 1845
 Tentablabus Slipinski & Lawrence, 1997
 Todima Grouvelle, 1893
 Todimopsis Ślipiński & Lawrence, 1997
 Trachypholis Erichson, 1845
 Trigonophloeus
 Xylolaemus Redtenbacher, 1858
 Zanclea

The genera Pycnomerodes, Pycnomerus and Rhizonium are sometimes included in the Colydiinae too. Other authors consider the latter incertae sedis among the Tenebrionoidea; for the former two, see above.  The species Xylolaemus sakhnovi was described in 2014 from a fossil preserved in Baltic amber, which dates to the Middle Eocene. This was the first species of Xylolaemus described from the fossil record. The extinct genus Paleoendeitoma, belonging to the extant tribe Synchitini is known from the Cenomanian aged Burmese amber of Myanmar.

See also 
 List of beetle species recorded in Britain – superfamily Tenebrionoidea

References

External links
Atlas of cylindrical bark beetles (Colydiidae) of Russia - Zoological Institute of Russian Academy of Sciences

Zopheridae
Articles containing video clips